The 2015 DHB-Pokal was the 39th edition of the tournament.

Format
The six best placed teams from the 2013–14 Handball-Bundesliga received a bye into the second round. The first round was split into north and south parts.

Round 1
The first round was drawn on 3 July 2014.

|-
|colspan=3 style="text-align:center;" |20 August 2014

|}

Round 2
The second round was drawn on 24 August 2014.

|-
|colspan=3 style="text-align:center;" |21 October 2014

|-
|colspan=3 style="text-align:center;" |22 October 2014

|}

Round 3
The third round was drawn on 29 October 2014.

|-
|colspan=3 style="text-align:center;" |17 December 2014

|}

Quarterfinals
The quarterfinals were drawn on 20 December 2014.

|-
|colspan=3 style="text-align:center;" |4 March 2015

|}

Final four

Bracket

Semifinals

Final

References

External links
Official website

2015